Villazón may refer to:

Places
Villazón, town and municipality in Modesto Omiste Province, Bolivia
Villazón (Salas), parish in Asturias, Spain

People
Edgardo José Maya Villazón (born 1951), Colombian lawyer
Eliodoro Villazón (1848–1939), Bolivian politician and President
Iván Villazón (born 1959), Colombian singer
Rolando Villazón (born 1972), Mexican opera singer